Papier-mâché binding is an approach to bookbinding in which the boards of the book are decoratively-sculpted papier-mâché covered in plaster, pressed in a mold. Papier-mâché binding was used in England during the mid-nineteenth century.

See also
Victorian era

References

Further reading

Bookbinding
Papier-mâché